Florence Kahn (née Prag; November 9, 1866 – November 16, 1948) was an American teacher and politician who in 1925 became the first Jewish woman to serve in the United States Congress. She was only the fifth woman to serve in Congress, and the second from California, after fellow San Franciscan Mae Nolan. Like Nolan, she took the seat in the House of Representatives left vacant by the death of her husband, Julius Kahn.

Life and career
Kahn was born in Salt Lake City, Utah to Conrad and Mary Prag, Jewish Polish immigrants who befriended the Mormon leader Brigham Young, and sold supplies during the gold rush. Her family moved to San Francisco, California in 1869. She graduated from the San Francisco Girls' High School in 1883, and received an A.B. from the University of California, Berkeley in 1887. She taught high school English and History at Lowell High School. She married Julius Kahn on March 19, 1899, who served in Congress until his death on December 18, 1924. She was his aide and, in parallel, she would write articles in the San Francisco Chronicle.

Florence Kahn was elected as a Republican to the 69th Congress, by special election, to fill the vacancy caused by the death of her husband, who had just been re-elected to a 13th term. She was reelected to the 70th, 71st, 72nd, 73rd, and 74th Congresses, serving from December 7, 1925 to January 3, 1937. She replaced her husband and became the first woman on the House Military Affairs Committee.

Kahn supported Herbert Hoover's unsuccessful campaign against Franklin Delano Roosevelt in the 1932 presidential election. She was an unsuccessful candidate for reelection to the 75th Congress in 1936.

Afterwards, Kahn actively tried to get women involved in politics. She was a member of the American Association of University Women, Hadassah and the Council of Jewish Women. She was a Reform Jew, and belonged to Congregation Emanu-El of San Francisco.

Kahn died in San Francisco on November 16, 1948, and was interred in the Home of Peace Cemetery in Colma, California.

Location of source materials relating to Florence Prag Kahn 

The Western Jewish History Center, of the Magnes Collection of Jewish Art and Life in Berkeley, California has a large collection of family papers, documents, correspondence, and photographs relating to Florence Prag Kahn and to her husband, Julius Kahn.

See also 
 List of Jewish members of the United States Congress
 Women in the United States House of Representatives

References 

 
 Seymour Brody. (1996) "Florence Prag Kahn". Jewish heroes & heroines of America: 150 true stories of American Jewish heroism. .
 Florence Kahn: Congressional Widow to Trailblazing Lawmaker Multimedia presentation created by the Office of History and Preservation, Office of the Clerk of the U.S. House of Representatives.

External links

1866 births
1948 deaths
American people of Polish-Jewish descent
American Reform Jews
University of California, Berkeley alumni
Female members of the United States House of Representatives
Women in California politics
Reform Jewish feminists
Jewish members of the United States House of Representatives
Jewish women politicians
Republican Party members of the United States House of Representatives from California
Burials at Home of Peace Cemetery (Colma, California)